Tri-County Regional Vocational Technical High School, often abbreviated Tri-County or just Tri, is a public vocational high school in Franklin, Massachusetts, United States.

District

The towns composing the district are:

Franklin, Massachusetts
Medfield, Massachusetts
Medway, Massachusetts
Millis, Massachusetts
Norfolk, Massachusetts
North Attleborough, Massachusetts
Plainville, Massachusetts
Seekonk, Massachusetts
Sherborn, Massachusetts
Walpole, Massachusetts
Wrentham, Massachusetts
Bellingham, Massachusetts

Curriculum

Academics

Students receive a full academic education including:
English
Mathematics
Science
Social Studies
Business Technology
Physical Education
Health

The College Board placed Tri-County Regional Vocational Technical High School on the 2014 AP District Honor Roll for the school’s significant gains in student access to and success in Advanced Placement courses. Tri-County was one of 547 school districts in the United States and Canada to be named to the 5th annual Honor Roll. The list recognizes school districts that have increased the number of students participating in AP while improving the number of students earning AP Exam scores of 3 or higher.

Ninety-four percent of Tri-County tenth graders scored a proficient or higher on the ELA portion of the Massachusetts Comprehensive Assessment System test in the spring of 2014. As a result of their performance, Tri-County was named a Level 1 school on the state's 5-point accountability system for the third straight year. This means the school meets gap narrowing goals.

Career Programs
The 15 Career Programs, known as “shops”, offered at Tri-County. They include:
Automotive Technology
Carpentry
Computer Information Systems
Cosmetology
Culinary Arts
Dental Assisting
Early Education 
Electrical Technology
Engineering Technology
Graphic Communications
Heating, Ventilation, Air Conditioning, and Refrigeration
Legal and Pro detective Services
Medical Careers
Metal Fabricator
Plumbing and Hydronic Heating

Athletics
Tri-County offers many sports for students. They include:

Baseball
Boys and Girls Basketball
Cheerleading (Fall and Winter)
Cross The Country
Football
Golf
Ice Hockey
Lacrosse
Boys and Girls Soccer
Softball
Track and Field
Volleyball
Sumo Wrestling

Tri-County is a member of the Mayflower League.
The league is made up of the following high schools:

Avon High School
Bishop Connolly High School
Bristol-Plymouth Regional Technical School
Bristol County Agricultural High School
Blue Hills Regional Technical School
Diman Regional Vocational Technical High School
Holbrook Junior Senior High School
Nantucket High School
Norfolk County Agricultural High School
Old Colony Regional Vocational Technical High School (Cougars Cup)
Sacred Heart High School
Southeastern Regional Vocational Technical High School
South Shore Vocational Technical High School
Upper Cape Cod Regional Technical High School
West Bridgewater High School
Westport High School

Adult Education

Tri-County also offers Adult Education courses. The Adult Education office offers Postsecondary programs in the Cosmetology and Nursing fields. The office also offers courses aimed at building career and life skills.

Notable alumni
Bobby Santos III, NASCAR Modified division racer

See also 

 List of High Schools In Massachusetts

References

External links

Schools in Norfolk County, Massachusetts
Public high schools in Massachusetts
Educational institutions accredited by the Council on Occupational Education